The Embassy of Turkey in North Nicosia is the diplomatic mission of the Republic of Turkey to the Turkish Republic of Northern Cyprus. It is located in the Turkish sector of Nicosia which is known as North Nicosia. It is the only diplomatic mission located in Northern Cyprus since only Turkey recognizes them. Other countries have their embassies in the Greek sector of Nicosia and they recognize the Republic of Cyprus's presence in the island.

History 
In June 1925, Consulate of Turkey to Cyprus (Turkish: Türkiye Şehbenderliği) opened in Larnaca. It was connected to Turkish Embassy in London. The consulate then moved to Nicosia in 1939. The new building was reflecting the traditional Turkish Cypriot architecture. After signing of the Zurich and London Treaties, the consulate in Nicosia became an embassy in 1960. Following the Turkish invasion of Cyprus, the embassy became very close to the UN Buffer Zone. It moved to across the Turkish Northern Cyprus Parliament Building in 1978. The chancery and the residence is still located in the same place.

Sub-divisions 
The embassy has several sub-divisions for different purposes. These include a military attaché and a press office. There are also consultancy offices for labor, social security, religious services, education, customs, treasury, finance and commercial activities. Yunus Emre Cultural Center which opened in 2015 also makes activities in the culture field.

List of ambassadors 

 İnal Batu, 1979-1984
 Bedrettin Tunabaş, 1984-1987
 Ertuğrul Kumcuoğlu, 1987-1991
 Cahit Bayar, 1991-1995
 Aydan Karahan, 1995-1996
 Ertuğrul Apakan, 1996-2000
 Hayati Güven, 2000-2004
 Aydan Karahan, 2004-2006
 Türkekul Kurttekin, 2006-2008
 Şakir Fakılı, 2009-2010
 Kaya Türkmen, 2010-2011
 Halil İbrahim Akça, 2011-2015
 Derya Kanbay, 2015-

See also 
 Embassy of Northern Cyprus in Ankara
 List of diplomatic missions of Turkey

References

TRNC
Turkey
Cyprus–Turkey relations
Northern Cyprus–Turkey relations